D'Orsi is a surname. Notable people with the surname include:

 Achille D'Orsi (1845–1929), Italian sculptor from Naples
 Lucy D'Orsi (born 1969), British police officer
 Umberto D'Orsi (1929–1976), Italian character actor and comedian

See also
 Orsi